Richard Eugene Sylla (born ) is the chairman of the board of trustees of the Museum of American Finance.

Before his retirement in 2015, he served as the Henry Kaufman Professor of the History of Financial Institutions and Markets and a professor of economics, entrepreneurship, and innovation at New York University Stern School of Business, where he taught courses in financial history, economic and business history of the United States, and comparative enterprise systems.  Professor Sylla also taught for the TRIUM Global Executive MBA Program alliance of NYU Stern, the London School of Economics and HEC School of Management, and served as academic director of executive programs at NYU Stern.

Biography
Prior to joining Stern, Sylla taught at North Carolina State University and the University of Pennsylvania.  His primary areas of research include historical studies of money, banking, and finance, and he is the past editor of Journal of Economic History and serves on the editorial board of many journals, including Financial History Review, Enterprise and Society, and Economic and Financial History Abstracts.  He once served as president of the Economic History Association and the Business History Conference. Sylla received several awards and grants, including National Science Foundation grants, an Alfred P. Sloan Foundation grant, and the Citibank Award for Excellence in Teaching at the Stern School. He resides in Hopkinton, New Hampshire and New York City with his wife Edith.

Sylla's brother, James, who was president of Chevron U.S.A. Inc., died in the crash of Pacific Southwest Airlines Flight 1771 in 1987.

Books
Sylla has (co)authored five books and co-edited several others.

Articles, chapters, and other publications
Sylla has published scores of articles and book chapters, including: and has also been quoted in USA Today.

Education
Professor Sylla received his BA from Harvard before studying at the Indian Statistical Institute at Calcutta.  He also received a MA and PhD from Harvard.

References

External links
NYU Stern Biography
Department of Economics Biography
USA Today Articles

New York University Stern School of Business faculty
Year of birth missing (living people)
Living people
Harvard University alumni
North Carolina State University faculty
University of Pennsylvania faculty
Fellows of the American Academy of Arts and Sciences
People from Hopkinton, New Hampshire
Presidents of the Economic History Association